Kathryn Evelyn Bard Cherry (1880– November 19, 1931) was an American impressionist painter and educator. She painted marine scenes, floral still life, and landscapes.

Early life and education
Cherry was born in 1880 in Quincy, Illinois and was educated at the St. Louis School of Fine Arts, New York School of Arts, and Pennsylvania Academy of Fine Arts.

Career

During the 1904 St. Louis World's Fair, Cherry's china paintings earned her a gold medal for female art. Two years later she began exhibiting her creations at the Saint Louis Artist's Guild. During this time period she was appointed "Master Craftsman" by the Boston Society of Arts and Crafts.

By 1912, Cherry and her sister Jessie M. Bard were chosen to teach at the Dawson Dawson-Watson Summer School of Painting and Handcraft. Three years later, she was promoted to head of the art department at Principia Junior College Academy. Cherry succeeded Frederick Oakes Sylvester as Principia art director. 

Cherry exhibited her works at the annual shows of the St. Louis Art League, the Kansas City Art Institute, and the Pennsylvania Academy. Her work often displayed marine scenes, floral still life, and landscapes of St. Louis. In 1924, her painting "Fish, Fruit, and Flowers" earned her a gold medal at the Kansas City Art Museum exhibition.

In 1926, her paintings at the Women's National Exposition earned her and Elizabeth Price a $1,000 prize and later a bronze medal at a Kansas art exhibition. Cherry died on November 19, 1931.

References

External links

1931 deaths
1880 births
People from Quincy, Illinois
Artists from St. Louis
Pennsylvania Academy of the Fine Arts alumni
American Impressionist painters
19th-century American educators